Following is a table of United States presidential elections in Nebraska, ordered by year. Since its admission to statehood in 1867, Nebraska has participated in every U.S. presidential election. Since 1992 Nebraska awards two electoral votes based on the statewide vote, and one vote for each of the three congressional districts.

Winners of the state are in bold. The shading refers to the state winner, and not the national winner.

See also
 Elections in Nebraska

Notes

References